Robert Hoffer is an American businessman that has worked for the past 25 years primarily in technology and software. He initially developed and launched one of the first online yellow pages. Hoffer is also credited with having developed instant messaging agents, web-based scratch-off games and several other now commonplace technologies. Over the course of his career, he has worked and consulted for many large corporations including Apple Computer, AOL, Xerox, PepsiCo, Playboy, Citibank and Lipton.

Inventions 
Hoffer often promotes the message that "everything old is new again"  arguing that many of today's inventions are simply repackaged versions of old ideas. This may be the driving force behind his work as co-founder of several Internet companies, including Infospace Corp., an Internet directory services provider; Query Labs, offering third-party directory services to newspapers and media firms and Typo.net, which launched the hotly debated concept of interstitial advertising. His vision is often credited with bringing products to market that today are used by millions of people, and have been purchased by companies like Yahoo, Microsoft and others, for millions of dollars. For example, in 1995, Hoffer was instrumental in bringing the first web-based national Yellow and White pages online, which were later licensed and co-branded with Yahoo, Nynex, American Express, Excite@Home, Lycos and others.

Patents 
As the co-founder of Colloquis in 2000, Hoffer created the first commercially viable online robot for instant messaging, securing a controversial patent for the technology. In 2006, Microsoft purchased ActiveBuddy (now Colloquis) for $46 million.

Notes 

American computer businesspeople
Living people
Year of birth missing (living people)